Muhammad Bilal Khan (1 January 1997 – 16 June 2019) was a Pakistani journalist, writer, poet, social media activist and blogger. He was assassinated by an unknown person in Islamabad.

Bilal was born on 1 January 1997, in Chilas, Gilgit-Baltistan, Pakistan. He studied at the Gordon College Rawalpindi and was a student of Sharia at the International Islamic University Islamabad.
He also worked for Al Wesal TV channel.

Death
On 16 June 2019 he was stabbed by an unknown person in G 9/4 area of Islamabad. He was laid to rest in Abbottabad. Human Rights Minister Shireen Mazari condemned Khan's killing and assured that the investigation.

More than 2 years after his murder on 20 September 2021, interior minister Sheikh Rasheed Ahmad revealed in a press conference that Bilal Khan's killer, Syed Abid Ali Shah, a resident of Kurram District, had been arrested along with a dagger that was used in the murder.

References 

1997 births
2019 deaths
Pakistani male journalists
Pakistani male writers
Pakistani male poets
Pakistani activists
Pakistani bloggers
People from Gilgit-Baltistan
Government Gordon College alumni
International Islamic University, Islamabad alumni
Deaths by stabbing in Pakistan
Assassinated Pakistani journalists
21st-century Pakistani writers
21st-century Pakistani poets